Million Dollar Infield is a 1982 made-for-TV film starring Bonnie Bedelia and Rob Reiner.

Four wealthy Long Islanders play for an amateur softball team. All four men suffer from profound personal and professional problems, thus the weekly ball game becomes a method of working out their frustrations. So adept do they become at this cathartic activity that their team makes it to the statewide championship—which leads to yet another crisis.

Cast
 Bonnie Bedelia as Marcia Miller
 Robert Costanzo as Artie Levitas
 Rob Reiner as Monte Miller
 Christopher Guest as Bucky Frische
 Bruno Kirby as Lou Buonomato
 Candice Azzara as Rochelle Levitas (as Candy Azzara)
 Gretchen Corbett as Carole Frische
 Elizabeth Wilson as Sally Ephron
 Philip Sterling as Harry Ephron
 Meeno Peluce as Joshua Miller
 Oliver Robins as Aaron Miller
 Shera Danese as Bunny Wahl
 Jack Dodson as Chuck
 Elsa Raven as Dr. Isabel Armen
 Neil Billingsley as Jay Frische
 Keith Coogan as Vance Levitas (as Keith Mitchell)
 Mel Allen as himself

References

External links

1982 television films
1982 films
1982 comedy-drama films
1980s American films
1980s English-language films
American comedy-drama television films
CBS network films
Films scored by Artie Kane